Nahr-e Jarrah (also Romanized as Nahr-e Jarrāḩ; also known as Nahr-e Jarrāḩ-e ‘Olyā) is a village in Buzi Rural District, in the Central District of Shadegan County, Khuzestan Province, Iran. At the 2006 census, its population was 432, in 76 families.

References 

Populated places in Shadegan County